Buddhism is a small minority religion in Bulgaria, with about a thousand practitioners. The Vietnamese community in Bulgaria traditionally practices Mahayana Buddhism alongside Ancestor Worship, but the population of this community, which mostly hails from North Vietnam, has declined from tens of thousands before 1990 to around 1,000 now. Some Buddhist believers in Bulgaria are of Chinese descent. A small number of native Bulgarians are converting to Theravada and Tibetan Buddhism.

There is an officially recognized Bulgarian Buddhist Karma Kagyu organization, which is a part of Diamond Way Buddhism led by Karmapa Trinley Thaye Dorje. They have several centers spread over the country.

Shechen has a mountain retreat center not far away from Sofia; access is granted to members, and it is not generally open to the public.

Further reading
 Nikolova, Antoaneta. “East-West Religiosity: Some Peculiarities of Religiosity of European Followers of Eastern Teachings and Practices.” Religiosity in East and West, 2020, pp. 77–98, 10.1007/978-3-658-31035-6_5. Accessed 13 October 2021.

References

External links
Official page of Diamond Way Buddhism Bulgaria
Official page of Shechen Bulgaria

Buddhism by country
Religion in Bulgaria
Bul